APXS is also an abbreviation for APache eXtenSion tool, an extension for Apache web servers.

An alpha particle X-ray spectrometer (APXS) is a spectrometer that analyses the chemical element composition of a sample from scattered alpha particles and fluorescent X-rays after a sample is irradiated with alpha particles and X-rays from radioactive sources. This method of analysing the elemental composition of a sample is most often used on space missions, which require low weight, small size, and minimal power consumption. Other methods (e.g. mass spectrometry) are faster, and do not require the use of radioactive materials, but require larger equipment with greater power requirements. A variation is the alpha proton X-ray spectrometer, such as on the Pathfinder mission, which also detects protons.

Over the years several modified versions of this type of instrument such as APS (without X-ray spectrometer) or APXS have been flown: Surveyor 5-7, Mars Pathfinder, Mars 96, Mars Exploration Rover, Phobos, Mars Science Laboratory and the Philae comet lander. APS/APXS devices will be included on several upcoming missions including the Chandrayaan-2 lunar rover.

Sources 

Several forms of radiation are used in APXS. They include alpha particles, protons, and X-rays. Alpha particles, protons, and X-rays are emitted during the radioactive decay of unstable atoms. A common source of alpha particles is curium-244. It emits particles with an energy of 5.8 MeV. X-rays of 14 and 18 keV are emitted in the decay of plutonium-240.

Alpha particles 

Some of the alpha particles of a defined energy are backscattered to the detector if they collide with an atomic nucleus. The physical laws for Rutherford backscattering in an angle close to 180° are conservation of energy and conservation of linear momentum. This makes it possible to calculate the mass of the nucleus hit by the alpha particle.

Light elements absorb more energy of the alpha particle, while alpha particles are reflected by heavy nuclei nearly with the same energy. The energy spectrum of the scattered alpha particle shows peaks from 25% up to nearly 100% of the initial alpha particles. This spectrum makes it possible to determine the composition of the sample, especially for the lighter elements. The low backscattering rate makes prolonged irradiation necessary, approximately 10 hours.

Protons 

Some of the alpha particles are absorbed by the atomic nuclei. The [alpha,proton] process produces protons of a defined energy which are detected. Sodium, magnesium, silicon, aluminium and sulfur can be detected by this method. This method was only used in the Mars Pathfinder APXS. For the Mars Exploration Rovers the proton detector was replaced by a second alpha particle sensor. So it is also called alpha particle X-ray spectrometer.

X-ray 

The alpha particles are also able to eject electrons from the inner shell (K- and L-shell) of an atom. These vacancies are filled by electrons from outer shells, which results in the emission of a characteristic X-ray. This process is termed particle-induced X-ray emission and is relatively easy to detect and has its best sensitivity and resolution for the heavier elements.

Specific instruments 

Alpha-X, for DAS lander on Phobos 1 and Phobos 2.
ALPHA, for Mars 96 landers. Collaboration between Germany, Russia, and USA.
Alpha Proton X-Ray Spectrometer, for Mars Pathfinder by the Max Planck Institute and the University of Chicago.
Alpha Particle X-ray Spectrometer, for Spirit (MER-A) and Opportunity (MER-B) Mars Exploration Rovers.
Alpha Particle X-ray Spectrometer, for Curiosity (MSL). The principal investigator for Curiositys APXS is Ralf Gellert, a physicist at the University of Guelph in Ontario, Canada. It was developed and funded by the Canadian Space Agency, with operations also supported by Guelph and United States' space administration.
Alpha Particle X-ray Spectrometer, for Philae, the European Space Agency's lander attached to Rosetta, to study the comet 67P/Churyumov–Gerasimenko.

Gallery

References

External links 

 

Mars Pathfinder
Mars Science Laboratory instruments
Science and technology in Canada
Canadian inventions
Space program of Canada
Mars Exploration Rover mission
X-ray spectroscopy
Spacecraft instruments
University of Guelph
Space science experiments